Senna Malik Miangué (born 5 February 1997) is a Belgian professional footballer who plays as a defender for Cercle Brugge. Having previously played in the academies of Beerschot and Royal Antwerp in his native Belgium, Miangué moved to Italy in 2013 to join Serie A side Internazionale.

Club career

Inter Milan
He appeared on the bench for Inter for the first time on 10 April 2016. He made his Serie A debut for the club on 28 August 2016, coming off the bench for Davide Santon in a 1–1 draw with Palermo. Two days later, he was rewarded with a new four-year deal with the club. He made his UEFA Europa League debut for Inter on 29 September in a 3–1 loss to Sparta Prague. Miangué made a total of four appearances for the club before signing for Cagliari, initially on loan, and then permanently.

Cagliari
On 26 January 2017, fellow Serie A side Cagliari announced Miangué's signing on loan for the remainder of the season, with the club retaining the option of purchase at the end thereof. He made his debut for the club on 29 January and assisted Marco Borriello for a 92nd-minute equalizer in a 1–1 draw with Bologna. He made two further appearances, as Cagliari ended the season in 11th position. On 30 June, he signed for the club permanently.

The following season, on 30 December, he received his first ever red card, when he was sent off in a league win over Atalanta.

Standard Liège (loan)
On 28 June 2018, Miangué returned to his native Belgium to join Standard Liège on a two-year loan deal. Miangue failed to win a place in the starting lineup for the club, losing out in the competition to Nicolas Gavory and financially troubled Standard eventually declined the option to take him over for three million euros.

Eupen (loan)
On 7 July 2020, Miangué joined Eupen on loan until 30 June 2021. He made his debut for the club in a 2–1 home win over Gent on 11 September, playing the full game at left-back. Miangué ended the season with 24 appearances, before returning to Cagliari as his loan spell ended.

Cercle Brugge
On 15 June 2021, it was announced that Miangué had joined Cercle Brugge on loan until 30 June 2022, with Cercle also having negotiated an option to buy in the deal. He made his debut as a starter on 24 July 2021 in a match against Beerschot which was interrupted after 55 minutes due to heavy rainfall. At that point, Miangué had been substituted due to a hamstring injury in the 36th minute for Boris Popovic.

On 23 June 2022, Cercle Brugge agreed on a permanent transfer with Cagliari and Miangué signed a three-year contract with the club.

International career
After having represented Belgium at various youth levels (starting in 2012 with the under-15 until 2019 with the under-21), Miangué switched nationality in March 2020, by accepting the call from Congo in the view of the double match against Eswatini for the 2021 Africa Cup of Nations qualification Group I.

Career statistics

Club

1 Includes Coppa Italia matches.
2 Includes UEFA Europa League matches.

Personal life
Miangué was born in Antwerp, Belgium, to a Congolese father, Boniface, who was also a footballer, and a Belgian Flemish mother, Anneke. His younger brother Che Malik was part of The Voice van Vlaanderen on VTM and played football for Royal Antwerp F.C., his sister Morane is singer and former contestant of The Voice van Vlaanderen. He is named after former Brazilian Formula 1 World Champion, Ayrton Senna. He is also fluent in four languages.

References

External links

1997 births
Living people
Belgian footballers
Belgium under-21 international footballers
Belgium youth international footballers
Black Belgian sportspeople
Inter Milan players
Cagliari Calcio players
Standard Liège players
K.A.S. Eupen players
Cercle Brugge K.S.V. players
Association football defenders
Serie A players
Belgian Pro League players
Belgian people of Republic of the Congo descent
Belgian expatriate footballers
Belgian expatriate sportspeople in Italy
Expatriate footballers in Italy